In enzymology, a mimosinase is an enzyme that catalyzes the chemical reaction

(S)-2-amino-3-(3-hydroxy-4-oxo-4H-pyridin-1-yl)propanoate + H2O  3-hydroxy-4H-pyrid-4-one + L-serine

Thus, the two substrates of this enzyme are (S)-2-amino-3-(3-hydroxy-4-oxo-4H-pyridin-1-yl)propanoate and H2O, whereas its two products are 3-hydroxy-4H-pyrid-4-one and L-serine.

This enzyme belongs to the family of hydrolases, those acting on carbon-nitrogen bonds other than peptide bonds, specifically in linear amides.  The systematic name of this enzyme class is mimosine amidohydrolase.

References

 

EC 3.5.1
Enzymes of unknown structure